Karl Frederick Freed (born September 25, 1942) is an American theoretical chemist recognized for his research in polymer physics. Freed has spent his academic career in the Department of Chemistry and the James Frank Institute at the University of Chicago, where he is the Henry G. Gale Distinguished Service Professor Emeritus. He is a member of the American Academy of Arts and Sciences, a Fellow of the American Physical Society, and was awarded the Polymer Physics Prize of the American Physical Society in 2014 and the Award in Pure Chemistry by the American Chemical Society in 1976.

Education
 Stuyvesant High School
Columbia University, B.S., 1963
Harvard University, A.M., 1965; Ph.D., 1967
University of Manchester, England, NATO Postdoctoral Fellow, 1967-1968

References

External links
Karl Freed at Google Scholar

1942 births
Living people
People from Brooklyn
Scientists from New York City
Fellows of the American Physical Society
Fellows of the American Academy of Arts and Sciences
20th-century American chemists
University of Chicago faculty
Harvard University alumni
Stuyvesant High School alumni
Columbia University alumni